Kimberley coastline (Western Australia) is a coastal region at the ocean edges of the Kimberley land region in the northern part of Western Australia.

It commences at the border with Northern Territory and ends at Wallal  where the Pilbara Coast commences.

It is over 12,000 km in length, and has more than 2,500 islands adjacent,  with archipelagoes, and a wide range of features not found in the more southern sections of the Western Australian coastline.

Apart from access at Broome, One Arm Point,  Derby, and Wyndham there are few points along the length of the coastline that can be accessed easily or safely.

As a result of the difficulty of access, tourism ventures by boat and air have exploited the isolated coastal features.

See also
 Capes of the Kimberley coastline of Western Australia
 Islands of the Kimberley (Western Australia)
 Northwest Shelf Province
 Northwest Shelf Transition

Notes

Kimberley coastline of Western Australia